Jonathan Skrmetti (born 1977) is an American attorney and public official. He currently serves as the 28th Attorney General and Reporter for the state of Tennessee.

Education 
Skrmetti earned degrees from George Washington University and Hertford College, Oxford. While earning his Juris Doctor from Harvard Law School, he served as the editor-in-chief of the Harvard Journal of Law & Public Policy.

Career 
Skrmetti previously clerked for Judge Steven Colloton on the U.S. Court of Appeals for the Eighth Circuit. As an adjunct professor, he taught cyberlaw at the University of Memphis Cecil C. Humphrey's School of Law. Before entering private practice, Skrmetti served as an Assistant U.S. Attorney with the Civil Rights Division of the U.S. Department of Justice and a federal prosecutor in Memphis. Skrmetti was also a partner at partner at Butler Snow LLP in Memphis.

Skrmetti served as Chief Counsel to Governor Bill Lee from 2021 to 2022. He also served as Chief Deputy Attorney General to Tennessee Attorney General Herbert H. Slatery III from 2018 to 2021.

Attorney General of Tennessee 
Skrmetti was appointed by the Tennessee Supreme Court to serve an eight-year term on August 10, 2022, and was sworn in on September 1, 2022. Tennessee is the only state in the country where the State Supreme Court appoints the attorney general as a non-partisan member of the Judicial Branch.

Personal life 
He is married and has four children, and resides in Franklin, Tennessee.

References 

1977 births
21st-century American politicians
Alumni of Hertford College, Oxford
George Washington University alumni
Harvard Law School alumni
Living people
Tennessee Attorneys General
Tennessee Republicans
University of Memphis faculty